Botrugno is a town and comune in the Italian province of Lecce in the Apulia region of south-east Italy.

The main sight is the marquisal palace, which was erected in 16th century and restored during the 17th century. It was Castriota Scanderbeg family in 1725 who built the baroque-style balcony.

References

Cities and towns in Apulia
Localities of Salento